An oocyte, oöcyte, or ovocyte is a female gametocyte or germ cell involved in reproduction. In other words, it is an immature ovum, or egg cell. An oocyte is produced in a female fetus in the ovary during female gametogenesis. The female germ cells produce a primordial germ cell (PGC), which then undergoes mitosis, forming oogonia.  During oogenesis, the oogonia become primary oocytes. An oocyte is a form of genetic material that can be collected for cryoconservation.

Formation

The formation of an oocyte is called oocytogenesis, which is a part of oogenesis. Oogenesis results in the formation of both primary oocytes during fetal period, and of secondary oocytes after it as part of ovulation.

Characteristics

Cytoplasm
Oocytes are rich in cytoplasm, which contains yolk granules to nourish the cell early in development.

Nucleus
During the primary oocyte stage of oogenesis, the nucleus is called a germinal vesicle.

The only normal human type of secondary oocyte has the 23rd (sex) chromosome as 23,X (female-determining), whereas sperm can have 23,X (female-determining) or 23,Y (male-determining).

Nest
The space within an ovum or immature ovum is located is the cell-nest.

Cumulus-oocyte complex
The cumulus-oocyte complex contains layers of tightly packed cumulus cells surrounding the oocyte in the Graafian follicle. The oocyte is arrested in Meiosis II at the stage of metaphase II and is considered a secondary oocyte. Before ovulation, the cumulus complex goes through a structural change known as cumulus expansion. The granulosa cells transform from tightly compacted to an expanded mucoid matrix. Many studies show that cumulus expansion is critical for the maturation of the oocyte because the cumulus complex is the oocyte's direct communication with the developing follicle environment. It also plays a significant role in fertilization, though the mechanisms are not entirely known and are species specific.

Maternal contributions

Because the fate of an oocyte is to become fertilized and ultimately grow into a fully functioning organism, it must be ready to regulate multiple cellular and developmental processes. The oocyte, a large and complex cell, must be supplied with numerous molecules that will direct the growth of the embryo and control cellular activities. As the oocyte is a product of female gametogenesis, the maternal contribution to the oocyte and consequently the newly fertilized egg, is enormous. There are many types of molecules that are maternally supplied to the oocyte, which will direct various activities within the growing zygote.

Avoidance of damage to germ-line DNA

The DNA of a cell is vulnerable to the damaging effect of oxidative free radicals produced as byproducts of cellular metabolism.  DNA damage occurring in oocytes, if not repaired, can be lethal and result in reduced fecundity and loss of potential progeny.  Oocytes are substantially larger than the average somatic cell, and thus considerable metabolic activity is necessary for their provisioning.  If this metabolic activity were carried out by the oocyte's metabolic machinery, the oocyte genome would be exposed to the reactive oxidative by-products generated.  Thus it appears that a process evolved to avoid this vulnerability of germline DNA.  It was proposed that, in order to avoid damage to the DNA genome of the oocytes, the metabolism contributing to the synthesis of much of the oocyte's constituents was shifted to other maternal cells that then transferred these constituents to oocytes.  Thus, oocytes of many organisms are protected from oxidative DNA damage while storing up a large mass of substances to nurture the zygote in its initial embryonic growth.

mRNAs and proteins
During the growth of the oocyte, a variety of maternally transcribed messenger RNAs, or mRNAs, are supplied by maternal cells. These mRNAs can be stored in mRNP (message ribonucleoprotein) complexes and be translated at specific time points, they can be localized within a specific region of the cytoplasm, or they can be homogeneously dispersed within the cytoplasm of the entire oocyte. Maternally loaded proteins can also be localized or ubiquitous throughout the cytoplasm. The translated products of the mRNAs and the loaded proteins have multiple functions; from regulation of cellular "house-keeping" such as cell cycle progression and cellular metabolism, to regulation of developmental processes such as fertilization, activation of zygotic transcription, and formation of body axes. Below are some examples of maternally inherited mRNAs and proteins found in the oocytes of the African clawed frog.

Mitochondria
The oocyte receives mitochondria from maternal cells, which will go on to control embryonic metabolism and apoptotic events. The partitioning of mitochondria is carried out by a system of microtubules that will localize mitochondria throughout the oocyte. In certain organisms, such as mammals, paternal mitochondria brought to the oocyte by the spermatozoon are degraded through the attachment of ubiquitinated proteins. The destruction of paternal mitochondria ensures the strictly maternal inheritance of mitochondria and mitochondrial DNA (mtDNA).

Nucleolus
In mammals, the nucleolus of the oocyte is derived solely from maternal cells. The nucleolus, a structure found within the nucleus, is the location where rRNA is transcribed and assembled into ribosomes. While the nucleolus is dense and inactive in a mature oocyte, it is required for proper development of the embryo.

Ribosomes
Maternal cells also synthesize and contribute a store of ribosomes that are required for the translation of proteins before the zygotic genome is activated. In mammalian oocytes, maternally derived ribosomes and some mRNAs are stored in a structure called cytoplasmic lattices. These cytoplasmic lattices, a network of fibrils, protein, and RNAs, have been observed to increase in density as the number of ribosomes decrease within a growing oocyte.

Prophase I arrest
Female mammals and birds are born possessing all the oocytes needed for future ovulations, and these oocytes are arrested at the prophase I stage of meiosis.  In humans, as an example, oocytes are formed between three and four months of gestation within the fetus and are therefore present at birth.  During this prophase I arrested stage (dictyate), which may last for many years, four copies of the genome are present in the oocytes.  The arrest of ooctyes at the four genome copy stage appears to provide the informational redundancy needed to repair damage in the DNA of the germline.  The repair process used likely involves homologous recombinational repair. Prophase arrested oocytes have a high capability for efficient repair of DNA damages.  DNA repair capability appears to be a key quality control mechanism in the female germ line and a critical determinant of fertility.

Paternal contributions
The spermatozoon that fertilizes an oocyte will contribute its pronucleus, the other half of the zygotic genome. In some species, the spermatozoon will also contribute a centriole, which will help make up the zygotic centrosome required for the first division. However, in some species, such as in the mouse, the entire centrosome is acquired maternally. Currently under investigation is the possibility of other cytoplasmic contributions made to the embryo by the spermatozoon.

During fertilization, the sperm provides three essential parts to the oocyte: (1) a signalling or activating factor, which causes the metabolically dormant oocyte to activate; (2) the haploid paternal genome; (3) the centrosome, which is responsible for maintaining the microtubule system. See anatomy of sperm

Abnormalities
 Nondisjunction—a failure of proper homolog separation in meiosis I, or sister chromatid separation in meiosis II can lead to aneuploidy, in which the oocyte has the wrong number of chromosomes, for example 22,X or 24,X. This is the cause of conditions like Down syndrome and Edwards syndrome in humans. It is more likely with advanced maternal age.
 Some oocytes have multiple nuclei, although it is thought they never mature.

See also 
 Cortical granule
 Cryoconservation of animal genetic resources
 Folliculogenesis
 Oocyte maturation inhibitor 
 Polar body
 Symmetry breaking and cortical rotation
 Oocyte abnormalities

References

Sources

External links 
 Micrograph of a primary oocyte and follicle of a monkey

Germ cells

de:Eizelle